Scopelogena is a genus of flowering plants belonging to the family Aizoaceae.

Its native range is South African Republic.

Species
Species:

Scopelogena bruynsii 
Scopelogena verruculata

References

Aizoaceae
Aizoaceae genera
Taxa named by Louisa Bolus